Beauty Newbie is a Thailand romantic television drama series starring Baifern Pimchanok Luevisadpaibul and Win Metawin Opas-iamkajorn based on popular webtoon My ID Is Gangnam Beauty by Ki Maeng-Gi. Produced by GMMTV and Parbdee Tawesuk and directed by F4 Thailand co-director and Girl From Nowhere screenwriter Mui Aticha Tanthanawigrai, this television series is set to air in 2023.

Synopsis 
Prima Paspimol (Baifern Pimchanok Luevisadpaibul) is a young girl who has been bullied her whole life because of her appearance. In an attempt to start fresh at university, she undergoes plastic surgery with the goal of looking like a regular student. However, the surgery turns out to be 'too successful', making her incredibly beautiful and drawing unwanted attention when all she wants is to blend in and avoid being bullied. Furthermore, some people begin to mock her for having too many surgical alterations to her face and call her names for having artificial beauty. Karin Sayapisit (Win Metawin Opas-iamkajorn), the popular campus heartthrob who went to the same middle school as Prima and knows what she looked like before her cosmetic surgery, confronts her about it. He reveals that in middle school he had never held any contempt for Prima because of her looks, unlike many others. The two quickly become close, Karin spends most of his time looking out for Prima and begins to take interest in her. But Prima's lack of self-esteem and fear of being ridiculed cause her to reject his feelings, especially when people on their campus think that someone like Karin should date someone with natural beauty like Faye (Fah Yongwaree Anilbol).

Cast and characters

Main 

 Baifern Pimchanok Luevisadpaibul as Prima Paspimol.
 (Webtoon character: Kang Mi-Rae)
 She is passionate about everything related to fragrance and studied chemistry in order to pursue her dream of becoming a perfumer. She struggles to fitting in because she doesn't meet societal standards of beauty. She desire a normal life and avoid standing out, but after being bullied in the past she decides to have cosmetic surgery before starting college.
 Win Metawin Opas-iamkajorn as Karin Sayapisit.
 (Webtoon character: Do Kyung-Seok)
 Karin is popular among his peers because of his intelligence, wealth, and good looks. However, his past experiences with his parents have caused him to become guarded and closed off. This has made it difficult for others to get close to him, leading people to perceive him as aloof or unapproachable.
 Fah Yongwaree Anilbol as Faye.
 (Webtoon character: Hyun Soo-Ah)
 The most popular girl in the chemistry department, renowned for her extraordinary natural beauty. Despite appearing sweet and genuine, she is actually desperate for attention and will go to great lengths to get it, including manipulating her gentle and innocent persona to steal the spotlight from others.
 Great Sapol Assawamunkong
 (Webtoon character: Yeon Woo-Young)
 Teaching assistant in the chemistry department who develops feelings for Prima.

Soundtrack 
The mock trailer features the song "I Wanna Be With You" by The Sarcastic, which was originally released in 2018.

Production 
This is the second adaptation of the webtoon, after My ID Is Gangnam Beauty was made into a Korean drama with the same name starring Im Soo-hyang and Cha Eun-woo in 2018. The Thailand adaptation was announced at the GMMTV23 Diversely Yours event on November 22nd, 2022 at Union Hall Bangkok. 

The director of the series, Mui Aticha Tanthanawigrai, mentioned in her tweets that the new version will be based on the original webcomic. It will be set in the modern era and will showcase women's determination to be happy with who they are, not what society thinks they should be. The main and secondary characters will support the protagonist shine in her own way, not just in terms of physical attractiveness. This version will also discuss other societal values that are often imposed on women, such as being a good wife and mother. In reality, however, women have the right to determine their own roles and identities. This is the message that the director hopes to convey through this new version of Beauty Newbie.

References

External links 

 GMMTV
 Official Trailer
 Beauty Newbie at IMDb

Television series by GMMTV
GMM 25 original programming
Thai romantic comedy television series
Television series by Parbdee Taweesuk